Pembroke Land District is one of the twenty land districts of Tasmania which are part of the cadastral divisions of Tasmania. It was formerly one of the 18 counties of Tasmania. It includes Tasman Peninsula and Port Arthur, as well as Forestier Peninsula, Dodges Ferry and Maria Island. The Electoral division of Pembroke is not actually within the land district, but is close by in Monmouth.

The original parishes
On 15 January 1836 George Arthur, the Lieutenant Governor of the Island of Van Diemen's Land
proclaimed, via The Hobart Town Courier, the first counties and parishes to be surveyed in the colony.
 
The County of Pembroke, bounded on the north by Little Swan port river; on the east by the Pacific ocean; on the south by Storm bay, and on the west by Storm bay, Norfolk bay, Pittwater, and by the eastern boundaries of the parishes of Ulva, Staffa and Ormaig, and a line to the south east angle of the county of Somerset. This county to include the White Rock, Maria island, Lachlan island, the Hippolyte rocks, Tasman's island, Wedge island, Sloping island, Garden island (now Smooth Island), Low island (now 'Green Island'), the islands in Pittwater, and all other islands adjacent to the coasts of the county.

Hundreds and parishes proclaimed at this time were:
 The hundred of Sorell
Canning parish
Forcett
Carlton
Sorell

The township of Sorell was proclaimed as being within the county.

References

Land Districts of Tasmania